USA is an abbreviation and country code for the United States of America.

USA, U.S.A., or Usa may also refer to:

Arts and entertainment

Music
 USA (King Crimson album), 1975
 U.S.A. (Flatlinerz album), 1994
 [USA] (Anamanaguchi album), 2019
 U.S.A. (United State of Atlanta), a 2005 album by Ying Yang Twins
 USA (Unconformable Social Amputees), a 2006 album by Saint Dog
 "U.S.A. (Aiight Then)", a 2000 song by Mobb Deep
 "U.S.A." (Da Pump song), a 2018 song
 "USA", a song by Jeff Rosenstock from the 2018 album POST-
 The United States of America (band), a late 1960s American experimental rock band
 The United States of America (album), 1968

Other uses in arts and entertainment
 U.S.A. trilogy, three 1930s novels by John Dos Passos
 USA Network, an American cable television channel

Businesses and organizations

Education
 Unionville-Sebewaing Area High School, Michigan, U.S.
 University of San Agustin, Philippines
 University of South Alabama, U.S.
 University of South Asia (Pakistan)

Other businesses and organizations
 United States Army, a branch of the United States Armed Forces
 United States Attorney, representing the federal government in United States district courts and courts of appeals
 Underground Service Alert, an organization in California, U.S. that coordinates the locating of underground utilities
 United Scenic Artists, an American labor union
 United Space Alliance, an American spaceflight company
 USA Funds, a nonprofit corporation

Places

Settlements
 Usa, Kōchi, Japan
 Usa, Ōita, Japan
 Usa District, Ōita, a former district
 Usa, Russia, the name of two rural localities
 Usa River, Tanzania

Rivers
 Usa (Germany), a tributary of the Wetter in Hesse, Germany
 Usa (Ufa), a right tributary of the Ufa in Russia
 Usa (Tom), a right tributary of the Tom in Russia
 Usa (Pechora), in Russia

Sports
 U-S-A!, a chant
 USA Perpignan, a French rugby union club
 United Soccer Association, a former soccer league in the United States and Canada

Other uses
 USA (brand), a cigarette brand of Liggett Group
 US-A (Upravlyaemy Sputnik Aktivnyy), Soviet reconnaissance satellites
 Usa, a legendary patron of Egypt, according to the Midrash Abkir
 Concord Regional Airport, in North Carolina, U.S. (IATA airport code USA)
 , a Panamanian tanker ship, formerly Empire Lad
 United Supermarkets Arena, at Texas Tech University, U.S.
 Uniform Securities Act, an American model statute for drafting state securities laws

See also

 U of SA (disambiguation)
 Us (disambiguation)
 µSA, a United States micropolitan statistical area
 Union of South Africa, the historical predecessor to the present-day Republic of South Africa
 United States of Africa, a hypothetical concept 
 USA Today, a newspaper
 USA Freedom Act, 2015 American legislation for "Uniting and Strengthening America"